Shanshan Airport ) , also known as Piqan Airport, is an airport serving Shanshan County (also known as Piqan), a city in Uyghur autonomous region of Xinjiang in the People's Republic of China.

Facilities

See also

List of airports in the People's Republic of China

Footnotes

Airports in Xinjiang